The Aland is a river in the German states of Lower Saxony and Saxony-Anhalt, left tributary of the Elbe. It is the continuation of the river Biese (downstream from Seehausen), which is the continuation of the river Milde. The Aland flows into the Elbe in Schnackenburg.

See also
List of rivers of Lower Saxony
List of rivers of Saxony-Anhalt

References

Rivers of Lower Saxony
Rivers of Saxony-Anhalt
Rivers of Germany